Marjan may refer to:

Places 
 Marjan, Croatia, Croatia, a hill on the peninsula of the city of Split
 Marjan, Albania, a village in the Gorë municipality, Korçë District, Albania
 Marjan, Alborz, a village in Iran
 Marjan, Fars, a village in Iran
 Marjan, Isfahan, a village in Iran
 Marjan island, an archipelago located in Ras al-Khaimah, United Arab Emirates
 Marjan, Kerman, a village in Iran
 Marjan Babamorad, a village in Iran
 Marjan Gomar, a village in Iran
 Marjan Qeytul, a village in Iran
 Margown, a city in Iran
 Maryanaj, a city in Iran
 Morad Jan, a village in Iran

Other uses 
 Marjan (film), 1956 Iranian film
 Marjan (name), a given name (includes a list of people with the name)
 Marjan (singer), Iranian pre-revolutionary actress and singer
 Marjan (lion), who once lived in the Kabul Zoo

See also
 
 
 Marjane (disambiguation)